Choreutis submarginalis is a moth in the family Choreutidae. It was described by Francis Walker in 1865. It is found on the Moluccas and the Maldives.

References

Choreutis